Trieste Airport is a railway station serving Trieste – Friuli Venezia Giulia Airport, located in Ronchi dei Legionari, in the region of Friuli-Venezia Giulia, northern Italy. The station opened on 19 March 2018 and is located on the Venice–Trieste railway. The train services are operated by Trenitalia.

Train services
The station is served by the following service(s):
High speed services (Frecciargento) Rome - Florence - Bologna - Padua - Venice - Trieste 
High speed services (Frecciarossa) Turin - Milan - Verona - Padua - Venice - TriesteIntercity services Rome - Florence - Bologna - Padua - Venice - TriesteExpress services (Regionale Veloce) Venice - Portogruaro - Cervignano del Friuli - TriesteRegional services (Treno regionale) Tarvisio - Carnia - Gemona del Friuli - Udine - Cervignano del Friuli - Trieste''

See also

History of rail transport in Italy
List of railway stations in Friuli-Venezia Giulia
Rail transport in Italy
Railway stations in Italy

Railway stations in Friuli-Venezia Giulia
Railway stations opened in 2018